The Aiguilles Dorées (3,519 m) are a multi-summited mountain of the Mont Blanc massif, overlooking the Plateau du Trient in the canton of Valais. They lie east of the Petite Fourche, on the range between the glaciers of Trient and Saleina.

The main (and westernmost) summit is named Aiguille de la Varappe. The other summits are the Tête Biselx (3,509 m) and Le Trident (3,436 m).

References

External links

 Aiguilles Dorées on Hikr
 Aiguilles Dorées on Summitpost

Mountains of the Alps
Alpine three-thousanders
Mountains of Valais
Mountains of Switzerland
Mont Blanc massif